Karel Podhajský (born 24 January 1973) is a Czech footballer who played as a goalkeeper. He made over 150 appearances in the Czech First League between 1994 and 2003.

References

External links
 
 

1973 births
Living people
Czech footballers
Czech Republic under-21 international footballers
Czech First League players
FC Hradec Králové players
FK Jablonec players
Association football goalkeepers